Wilhelm Troszel (26 August 1823 - 2 March 1887) was a Polish composer and operatic bass. Born in Warsaw, he was the son of composer and piano maker Wilhelm Troschel. He made his stage debut at the Grand Theatre, Warsaw on 17 April 1843. At that theatre he notably created the role of Zbigniew in the world premiere of Stanisław Moniuszko's The Haunted Manor at the Grand Theatre, Warsaw in 1865.

References

External links
 Scores by Wilhelm Troszel in digital library Polona

1823 births
1887 deaths
Operatic basses
Polish composers
19th-century Polish male opera singers
19th-century composers